Gigean is a commune in the Hérault département in Occitanie in southern France.

Geography
Gigean is bordered by the Étang de Thau to its west, the Gardiole hills to its south and by a wine growing plain, which runs from the Moure Hills to the edge of Montpellier.

The climate is Mediterranean: warm and dry in the summer, mild in the winter. Autumn is often marked by rain and heavy wind.

Neighboring communes
Poussan, Montbazin, Cournonsec, Fabrègues, Vic-la-Gardiole, Frontignan and Balaruc-le-Vieux.

Population
Its inhabitants are called Gigeannais

Sights
Saint Félix-de-Montceau: 13th century abbey, a listed monument historique since 1925, now in ruins, situated on the Gardiole hills.
Église Saint Genis: 13th century church.

See also
Communes of the Hérault department

References

External links

 Official site
 "Gigean-village" Information about the commune
 Abbey

Communes of Hérault